The International Gilbert and Sullivan Festival was founded in 1994 by Ian Smith and his son Neil and is held every summer in England. The two- or three-week Festival of Gilbert and Sullivan opera performances and fringe events attracts thousands of visitors, including performers, supporters, and G&S enthusiasts from around the world. The Festival was held in Buxton, Derbyshire, from 1994 to 2013, and from 2014 to 2022, it was held in Harrogate, North Yorkshire, usually with a week in Buxton preceding the main part of the Festival. The entire Festival is set to return to Buxton in 2023.

At the Festival, there are both professional and amateur Gilbert and Sullivan performances. Among the professional offerings are performances each year by the Festival's homegrown National Gilbert & Sullivan Opera Company. Amateur Gilbert and Sullivan performing societies from around the world perform on the Festival's main stage each year. A smaller nearby theatre and other venues host the Festival fringe, which consists of dozens of performances, including a Unifest competition among university groups, and lectures, a memorabilia fair, and other events.

History
The Festival was founded in 1994 by English businessman Ian Smith (1939–2019) and continues to be produced by his wife Janet, son Neil and their family to preserve and enhance the knowledge, understanding and appreciation of the works of Gilbert and Sullivan. It also has a goal of reinstating G&S and the performing arts in schools in Britain. On several occasions, the Festival added a week of performances in the United States. The founders believe that the Gilbert and Sullivan works are an important national heritage and legacy, especially as performed in the tradition of the venerable D'Oyly Carte Opera Company, which performed Gilbert and Sullivan's Savoy Operas continuously, year-round, for over a century until 1982. When the D'Oyly Carte Opera Company closed in 1982, greatly diminishing the amount of Gilbert and Sullivan produced in Britain, Ian Smith "had a burning anger" that the  English Arts Council had not subsidised the company, and this led him to found the Festival.

The Festival was held in Buxton, England, every year from 1994 to 2013, but it experimented with producing additional Festival weeks in other towns or cities, including Eastbourne, England once; Philadelphia, Pennsylvania, twice; Berkeley, California, once; and Gettysburg, Pennsylvania, twice. The main part of the Festival relocated to Harrogate, England, in 2014. where it continues to be held each summer. From about 2015 the Festival has also given a week of mostly professional shows in Buxton shortly before its main opening in Harrogate.

The Festival was not held in 2020, when Harrogate was hosting an NHS Nightingale Hospital during the Covid-19 pandemic. During the shutdown, the Festival launched an online streaming service that presents recorded performances from past Festivals and some live content. The Festival was also awarded a grant of £120,000 from the government Culture Recovery Fund. The Festival resumed annually in 2021. Until 2022, it continued to run for a week in Buxton and nearly two weeks in Harrogate. In 2023 the entire Festival is set to return to Buxton.

Description
Each summer, beginning with the last weekend in July or first weekend in August, the Festival includes two or three weeks of nightly G&S operas (and weekend matinees) and dozens of daytime fringe activities, The Festival has sold more than 25,000 tickets in some years and has attracted up to 2,000 performers.

Sky Arts described the Festival as "one of the most colourful, melodic and joyous festivals of musical theatre you will come across. Celebrating the timeless, waspishly satirical lyrics of W. S. Gilbert and the brilliant musical inventiveness of Arthur Sullivan, the festival is quite simply the world’s biggest event dedicated to the Savoy operas. ...  It is forward-looking and fun presenting contemporary as well as traditional productions of G&S." The Festival's professional orchestra accompanies the main stage performances.

The competition

The Festival began as mostly a competition among amateur G&S performing troupes from Britain and around the world, with up to a dozen or so amateur performances. On the weeknights during each Festival, "the best non-professional groups from the UK and overseas compete for the International Champions title." Some groups perform year after year at the Festival, but some companies, especially those travelling from North America, South Africa, Australia and other distant places, may visit only occasionally or once. Others meet and rehearse entirely at the Festival. The day of performance for each amateur group is hectic, with move-in to the theatre at 9 a.m., lighting call at 11 a.m., the one and only tech-dress rehearsal (with the Festival orchestra) in the afternoon, the performance in the evening, and move-out immediately afterwards.

A professional adjudicator critiqued each amateur performance immediately after the curtain fell. The adjudicator then scored each performance, and both group and individual awards were announced at the end of the Festival. At the first Festival in 1994, first prize was awarded to the production of Utopia, Limited, presented by the Gilbert & Sullivan Society of Maine, in the US (then known as the G&S Society of Hancock County). The Derby Gilbert & Sullivan Company won the first prize more often than any other company (six times); and the South Anglia Savoy Players won five times and placed second four times. Festival Productions, Ireland, won in three consecutive years, 2007 to 2009. Individual awards were also presented for performers, directors and musical directors. The internet group SavoyNet, which has competed each year since 1997, were Festival Champions in 2013 and 2018 and are the first and only company to present all 14 G&S operas at the Festival. By the end of the second decade of the Festival, the number of amateur productions decreased, and after 2019, the competitive aspect of the Festival has been discontinued. 

The Festival organizers have also rehearsed and presented, some years, an adult "Festival production" or a "Youth Production" (for performers aged 9 to 19). Beginning in 2015, they have presented a "Bus Pass Opera" production (for performers over 60). A "Unifest" competition among university groups is presented simultaneously, as part of the Festival fringe.

Professional productions

As the Festival matured, it presented more and more professional performances, first on weekends and now throughout the programme. These are given by companies such as the Carl Rosa Opera Company, Opera della Luna, the New York Gilbert and Sullivan Players, Charles Court Opera, and the Festival's self-produced National Gilbert & Sullivan Opera Company, which has starred such well-known G&S performers as Richard Suart, Simon Butteriss, Bruce Graham, Gillian Knight, Barry Clark, Michael Rayner, Patricia Leonard, Donald Maxwell, Jill Pert, Gareth Jones, Oliver White, Rebecca Bottone, Ian Belsey and the Opera Babes. John Owen Edwards, David Russell Hulme, David Steadman, Andrew Nicklin and John Andrews have served as musical director of the company. Sky Arts calls these performers "some of the UK’s finest exponents of musical theatre". Raymond J. Walker wrote of the National G&S Opera Company:
"With a reputation for strong casts [and] energetic delivery, traditionally fresh interpretations are brought to roles familiar to a large proportion of the [Festival] audiences.  With good stars like Jill Pert and Richard Suart in key roles, we were assured of an excellent evening’s entertainment. ... Care is always taken with the staging and lighting of these ... productions and, as with Princess Ida last year, they can match a West End show. ...  Throughout, the chorus was outstanding. ... the strength of singing from the twenty-strong chorus in forte passages was spectacular".

Uniquely among professional companies in Britain, other than D'Oyly Carte, the National G&S Opera Company has presented all 13 of the extant Savoy Operas. The Daily Telegraph "thoroughly enjoyed [the company's] spirited production" of Utopia, Limited in 2011, an opera that has rarely been given a professional staging in Britain over the past century. In 2012 the Festival mounted the first full-scale professional production with orchestra of The Grand Duke in Britain since the 19th century. In 2010, the National G&S Opera Company presented its first production outside of the Festival, The Yeomen of the Guard, at Oxford Castle. The company soon began touring its productions in repertory from June to August each summer, giving performances in up to six towns and cities, including Buxton. A review of the opening night of the 2014 tour praised the direction, choreography and conducting of The Pirates of Penzance and said of the company: 
They are a real find with strong production values, a great orchestra and first class singing. Musically, this is a very strong show. It all looks marvellous with picture book settings and eye catching costumes plus a full and energetic cast. ... It all works superbly with a company obviously enjoying themselves. The chorus work is top notch, and they all come across as individuals.

The National G&S Opera Company has generally staged four productions at the Festival each summer since 2015, giving up to 16 performances there, while the other professional companies usually give a few performances each. In 2018, in connection with the 25th anniversary of the Festival, the company presented six productions, including the first professional production of Haddon Hall since the 19th century.

Venues and fringe events

All of the competition and the weekend professional performances have been given on the Festival's main stage. From 1994 to 2013, that was the Frank Matcham-designed 900-seat Buxton Opera House. From 2014 to 2022, the main stage was the 1,100-seat Royal Hall in Harrogate, another Matcham-designed theatre. These performances are nearly always accompanied by the "National Festival Orchestra". In 2023 the Festival is set to return to Buxton. A review of a 2010 performance noted, "The music was up to [the Festival's] usual high standard, with the orchestra (leader, Sally Robinson) ... giving a superb and sprightly reading of the Overture and score throughout." The Festival also hosts dozens of performances and fringe activities in smaller venues. In Buxton, these include the 360-seat Pavilion Arts Centre. In Harrogate, some fringe performances were held in the 500-seat Harrogate Theatre and others at various venues in and around the town, including at the Festival's purpose-built theatre next door to the Royal Hall.

The "fringe" activities have included performances, master classes and lectures by members of the original D'Oyly Carte Opera Company (such as Valerie Masterson, Thomas Round, Gillian Knight, Kenneth Sandford, John Ayldon and John Reed) and other professionals, and a late night Festival Club, where cabaret performances are given each evening after the opera, and sometimes a G&S singalong is conducted. Some years have included scholarly symposia, and rarely revived works by Gilbert or separately by Sullivan are also seen. There is also a G&S memorabilia fair, providing a chance for collectors and gift hunters to buy and sell G&S recordings, DVDs, books, scores, figurines and other items of interest. Fringe events also include recitals, concerts, lectures and productions of lesser-known works by Gilbert without Sullivan, Sullivan without Gilbert, works that played as companion pieces with the Gilbert and Sullivan operas during their original productions and other Victorian and Edwardian works.

Effect and allure of the Festival
The Festival serves as a "lightning-rod" of G&S activity worldwide. G&S performers and audiences from one part of the world can see performances by groups from other parts of the world.  Performances in the traditional style mix with avant garde ones, and G&S scholars can communicate with a wide audience of enthusiasts.

Buxton, an intimate, yet bustling spa town located in the Peak District about an hour southeast of Manchester, has proved to be an excellent setting for summer opera festivals, with good choices for lodging, dining and local sightseeing. There are nearby castles (for example, Peveril Castle), stately homes (e.g. Chatsworth House, Haddon Hall, Hardwick Hall and Calke Abbey); and numerous limestone caverns, including Poole's Cavern, right at the edge of Buxton. The small size of the town allows visitors and performers to meet and mingle freely during the course of the Festival. Jean Dufty, in Gilbert & Sullivan News wrote: "The amateur performances were of a very high standard....  There is a lovely atmosphere in Buxton of Gilbert and Sullivan thriving, being enjoyed, and drawing everyone together as a family."  The Festival has developed "a reputation for being one of the friendliest musical festivals anywhere, with people returning year after year to soak up its special atmosphere."

A feature in Gilbert & Sullivan News commented: "The amateur performances were of a very high standard. ... There is a lovely atmosphere ... of Gilbert and Sullivan thriving, being enjoyed, and drawing everyone together as a family." In addition, the Festival aims to raise awareness and funds for its organizers' efforts to re-introduce G&S into British schools. The Festival has been featured in several British television shows and in the documentary films Oh Mad Delight and A Source of Innocent Merriment. Sky Arts broadcast its features about the Festival and Gilbert and Sullivan several times in 2010.

Recordings
Recordings on DVD of most of the amateur and professional productions that have been seen at the Festival, as well as for some of the fringe events, are produced by the Festival organizers. Some of the Festival's professional shows are also available on CD.

Companies that have performed at the Festival

Professional
Carl Rosa Opera Company, London
Charles Court Opera, London
Forbear! Theatre, London and touring
Heritage Opera, touring
National Gilbert & Sullivan Opera Company, Harrogate and touring
The New York Gilbert and Sullivan Players, New York City and touring
Opera della Luna, touring

Most successful amateur UK award winners
Derby Gilbert & Sullivan Company (six championships; company closed in 2018)
South Anglia Savoy Players (five championships)
Festival Productions (Ireland) (three championships)

Foreign amateur competitors
Blue Hill Troupe (New York City, US)
The Brussels Light Opera Company (Brussels, Belgium)
Cape Town G&S (Cape Town, South Africa)
 Fraser Valley Stage (Abbotsford, British Columbia, Canada)
The Gilbert and Sullivan Society of Chester County (Pennsylvania, US)
The Gilbert and Sullivan Society of Houston (Texas, US)
The Gilbert & Sullivan Society of Maine
The Gilbert and Sullivan Society of Victoria (Melbourne, Australia) 
Lamplighters Music Theatre of San Francisco
Savoy Company (Philadelphia, Pennsylvania, US)
SavoyNet (email-based, with performers from around the world)
St. Anne's Music and Drama Society (Toronto, Canada) 
Seattle Gilbert & Sullivan Society (Washington, US)

See also
List of opera festivals

Notes

References

External links
International Gilbert and Sullivan Festival official website  
Fan site with extensive Festival information, reviews and photos
Documentary film Oh Mad Delight
Documentary film A Source of Innocent Merriment
Davis, Carol and Victoria Willoughby. 2004 description of the Festival
Garnett, Stephen. "Buxton Festival 2008 – A Summer Celebration of Gilbert & Sullivan", This England, 2008
Lee, Bernard.  "Gilbert and Sullivan are still going strong after a century", Sheffield Telegraph, 2008
Christiansen, Rupert. "The International Gilbert and Sullivan Festival: a uniquely British phenomenon", The Telegraph, 2009
Excerpt of SkyArts video about the Festival 2010

Gilbert and Sullivan
Music festivals in Derbyshire
Tourist attractions of the Peak District
Opera festivals
Music festivals established in 1994
Buxton
Events in Harrogate
Music festivals in North Yorkshire